John Baker Richards was Governor of the Bank of England from 1826 to 1828. He had been Deputy Governor from 1824 to 1826. He replaced Cornelius Buller as Governor and was succeeded by Samuel Drewe.

See also
Chief Cashier of the Bank of England

References

External links

Governors of the Bank of England
Year of birth missing
Year of death missing
British bankers
Deputy Governors of the Bank of England